Johannes Lamparter (born 8 November 2001) is an Austrian nordic combined skier.

His breakthrough season was 2020–21 FIS Nordic Combined World Cup, when he achieved two podium results in World Cup competition. But he made spectacular results on FIS Nordic World Ski Championships 2021. Lamparter won two gold medals, one in individual large hill Gundersen and second in team sprint. He also took bronze medal in relay.

World Championship

References

External links

Living people
2001 births
Austrian male Nordic combined skiers
FIS Nordic World Ski Championships medalists in Nordic combined
Nordic combined skiers at the 2022 Winter Olympics
Olympic Nordic combined skiers of Austria
People from Hall in Tirol
Sportspeople from Tyrol (state)